Tom D'Angora is a three-time Drama Desk nominated and Off-Broadway Alliance Award-winning New York based theatrical producer whose Broadway credits include co-producer of the 2021 revival of Caroline, Or Change and whose Off-Broadway credits include lead producer of Newsical The Musical, Naked Boys Singing!, The Marvelous Wonderettes, A Musical About Star Wars, Back In Pictures,  the Backstage Bistro Award-winning Divas I've Done and A Broadway Diva Christmas. D'Angora is the creator and lead producer of the soapy new drama, Mélange, starring Morgan Fairchild, which is currently in development.

Between Dec 2020 and July 2021 D'Angora produced several high-profile virtual fundraiser concerts to save local theaters. This included The West Bank Cafe/Laurie Beechman Theatre, the legendary jazz club, Birdland, The LABrynth Theatre and The York Theatre, as well as campaigns for The Theatre World Awards and The Stonewall Inn Safe Spaces.  He is a verified Twitter influencer who is well known for his politics, community activism, and producing.

Early career
D'Angora starred in the highly controversial 2001 Provincetown production of Naked Boys Singing and in 2007 took over the producing responsibilities. Since then he has produced and directed the 2009, 2010, 2011, and 2012 productions with Duling. In addition to Naked Boys Singing he has also brought such acts as Golden Girls Rue McClanahan, Ellen Greene, Christine Pedi, Debbie Does Dallas: the Musical, and most notably ICONS: drag extravaganza which has transferred to an Off-Broadway run in 2011.

D'Angora's first foray into producing was with his one-man show titled Divas I've Done that started at Don't Tell Mama's, transferred to LA's Room 5 Lounge, played the 2004 summer season in Provincetown, MA, and eventually played Off-Broadway.  It was the final show to play Upstairs at Studio 54 before the space closed and ended its run at Theater Row.  The show won D'Angora the Backstage Bistro Award for Best Musical Comedy, beating out Broadway stars and Cabaret legends for the honor  During that time D'Angora established relationships with many of the "divas" featured in his show including Little Shop of Horrors' Ellen Greene, whose album In His Eyes D'Angora he served as Executive Producer on.  In 2005, D'Angora and his now husband Michael Duling, brought Greene as well as recording and Broadway artist Maya Days, Emmy nominee Kathy Brier, Tony Award nominee Marla Schaffel, and Forbidden Broadway's Christine Pedi together for the seasonal musical revue A Broadway Diva Christmas.

Broadway and Off-Broadway career

In 2010 D'Angora began producing responsibilities of NEWSical: the Musical, the ever evolving Off-Broadway musical which spoofs newsmakers, celebrities, politicians, and pop culture trends.  The show went on to be nominated for Drama Desk Awards for the 2010 edition, titled "We Distort You Decide".  The 2011 edition, "Full Spin Ahead!", was nominated for the Drama Desk Award for Best Musical Revue  and won the Off-Broadway Alliance Award for Best New Musical. in 2012 D'Angora opened his third consecutive edition of NEWSical titled "End of the World Edition" which was nominated for a Drama Desk Award for Best Musical Revue. In 2012 D'Angora revolutionized Off-Broadway casting when it was announced that NEWSical would have a rotating cast of celebrity guest stars appearing. Celebrity guest stars included Perez Hilton, Andrea McArdle, Cheri Oteri, Carson Kressley, Jackee Harry, Kandi Burruss and La Toya Jackson. By the end of its run in 2019 at Theatre Rows Kirk Theater it was the longest running show in the history of the legendary theater complex and the 5th longest running off-Broadway musical in history.  During the Covid-19 pandemic, NEWSical was the only union approved NYC based production to perform when it did a socially distanced, one-night only, engagement at The Lied Center For Performing Arts in Lincoln, NE. The show was later live streamed as a benefit for The Actors Fund of America.

In 2012, D'Angora took over producing and general management responsibilities for the long-running hit, Naked Boys Singing! after having produced several versions of the show in Provincetown.  In 2021 he opened a production of the show in Las Vegas.  Originally set to star Aaron Carter, the production and the star parted ways due to breech of contract involving the star not wanting to be vaccinated against COVID-19.  The production opened a few weeks after originally planned without Carter.

D'Angora served as lead producer of the 2016 revival of The Marvelous Wonderettes.  Featuring songs from the 1950s and 1960s the revival ran for three years and featured notable performers such as Diana DeGarmo, Ryann Redmond, Jenna Leigh Green, Christina Bianco, Kristy Cates, and more.  The productions run surpassed the original production and after 567 performances closed on January 6, 2019.

On May-The-Fourth, 2019 D'Angora opened the irreverent musical comedy A Musical About Star Wars. The show-within-a-show follows two "Star Wars nerds" as they attempt to put on a Star Wars tribute musical only to have their co-star interrupt their performance with a political protest. The show transferred from its original home at Theatre Row to a larger venue, and appropriately named, St. Luke's Theater, shortly after opening.  The show's cast album was later released on Broadway Records.

Addy & Uno was Tom's first foray into children's entertainment.  It was the first Off-Broadway family musical to address disability.  The show centered around a group of friends with various disabilities (Autism, ADHD, Low-Vision, Cerebral Palsy) as they encourage their friend Uno to overcome his nerves and compete in the school's math competition.  The show as nominated for the Off-Broadway Alliance Award.

D'Angora made his Broadway debut serving as a Co-Producer on the Roundabout Theatre Company's revival of Caroline, Or Change

Television and streaming

D'Angora created and produced the highly stylized soapy drama, Mélange, which starred Morgan Fairchild and featured a notable cast from soaps, reality TV, social media, and Broadway.  The show was inspired by his love of ABC daytime soaps One Life to Live, All My Children, and the prime time camp-class Dynasty.  The pilot episode premiered on Logo TV's digital platforms on May 20, 2020. The show is currently in development for a full season.

On December 25, 2020 D'Angora served as producer for an all-star "Christmas Day Telethon" to Save The West Bank Cafe and Laurie Beechman Theatre.  The 10-hour show featured talents such as Andre De Shields, Debra Messing, Nathan Lane, Matthew Broderick, Alice Ripley, and almost 400 stars from Broadway, film, television, and beyond.  The event was attached to a GoFundMe which brought in over $300,000 for the venue which was in severe debt from the pandemic which shut down Broadway.

A few weeks later, he with Michael D'Angora and Tim Guinee produced another fundraiser and streaming event to save the historic jazz club Birdland.  The concert featured President Bill Clinton, Clive Davis, Wynton Marsalis, Veronica Swift, Sting, Whoopi Goldberg, George Coleman, Ravi Coltrane, Norm Lewis, Lillias White, and more.

D'Angora has been featured as himself appearing in several reality television shows including Real Housewives of Atlanta (Bravo), Life with La Toya (OWN), and Edens World (Logo). NEWSical and D'Angora were the subject of a full episode of Life with La Toya in 2014.  D'Angora has also worked in film serving as a co producer on The Big Gay Musical and Executive producer on Mangus.

Awards and honors

NEWSical The Musical won the first annual Off-Broadway Alliance Award for Best Musical in 2011.  It was nominated for The Drama Desk Awards in 2011 for Best Revue and Best Lyrics 

December 12, 2021 was declared "Tom and Michael D'Angora Appreciation Day" by the NY State Senate to commemorate the day they began their charitable fundraising for theatrical venues affected by the pandemic and for their work advocating for LGBTQ+ Equality.

References

 Hamstra, Stu.  "'Naked Boy' Wins 2004 Bistro Award & Returns One More Time To Salute His Divas"  Cabarat Hotline Online; Jan 1, 2006, SVHamstra.com
 Wong, Wayman. "The Leading Men" Playbill.com, Dec 1, 2003
 Gans, Andrew. "Confessions of a Broadway Fan" Playbill.com, July 7, 2005
 Genzlinger, Neil.  "Invoking the Touch of a Diva: Holiday Favorites with Wit" The New York Times, Nov 14, 2005
 Bragg, Mary Ann. "Crown Emerges Unscathed at 'Naked' Hearing"  Provincetown Banner, March 17, 2001, ProvincetownBanner.com
 Deschroches, Stephen. "ICONS at the Post Office Cabaret", Provincetown Magazine, Aug 13, 2011
 NewsDesk, "ICONS, the new drag tribute show launches off-broadway", Broadwayworld.com, Nov 14, 2011
 Deschroches, Stephen. "ICONS at the Post Office Cabaret", Provincetown Magazine, Aug 13, 2011
 Gans, Andrew. "Bianco, West, O'Malley, Griffin and Walker Will Join Pedi in Off-Broadway Return of NEWSical the Musical" playbill.com, November 10, 2009
 DramaDesk.com/nominations.html
 OffBroadwayAlliance.com/awards/

American theatre managers and producers
Living people
1979 births